The 1971–72 Rugby Union County Championship was the 72nd edition of England's County Championship rugby union club competition. The competition was no longer the premier club competition because a National Knockout Competition called the John Player Cup had been introduced.

Gloucestershire won their tenth title (but first since 1937) after defeating Warwickshire in the final.

Semi finals

Final

See also
 English rugby union system
 Rugby union in England

References

Rugby Union County Championship
County Championship (rugby union) seasons